Halco Mining is an aluminium company based at Pittsburgh, Pennsylvania (USA). The company is organized under the laws of the state of Delaware in the United States.  Halco is the 51% owner of the stock of Compagnie des Bauxites de Guinée, the primary aluminium mine and smelter operator in Guinea, known as CBG.

The consortium was established in 1962 by Harvey Aluminium Company to mine bauxite deposits in the Boké region. Halco/CBG owns the rights to mine bauxite in a 10,000 square kilometer area of northwestern Guinea under a seventy five year lease through the year 2038.

Related organizations
Halco's stock is owned by the following companies:

Alcoa – 45% 
Rio Tinto Group – 45%
Dadco Investments Limited  – 10%

See also
Aluminium in Africa
Aluminium in Guinea
Gite

References

External links
Halco Mining
CBG page at Halco
MBendi:Mining:Bauxite:Guinea

Aluminium companies of Guinea
Mining companies of Guinea
Alcoa